Boetharius (died c.623) was bishop of Chartres from about 594. He was chaplain to Clothaire II and, for a while, had been the captive of Theuderic II.

He is a Catholic and Orthodox saint, his feast day is 2 August.

Notes

620s deaths
6th-century Frankish bishops
Bishops of Chartres
7th-century Christian saints
Year of birth unknown